Wille is a surname and may refer to 

Bruno Wille (1860–1928), a German politician
Clare Wille (born 1973), English stage and television actor
Frey Wille, Austrian enamel jewellery manufacturer
Hans Wille (1807–1877), Norwegian priest and politician
George Alfred Henry Wille (1871-1951), Sri Lankan Burgher proctor, notary public, journalist, and politician
Jacob Andreas Wille (1777–1850), Norwegian priest and politician
Jodi Wille, American filmmaker, book publisher, curator and film programmer
Johann Georg Wille (1715–1808), German engraver
Joop Wille (1920–2009), Dutch international footballer
Lois Wille (1931–2019), American journalist and writer
Martin Wille (born 1986), an international footballer from Liechtenstein
Nordal Wille (1858–1924), Norwegian botanist
Paul Wille, Belgian senator
Rudolf Wille (1937–2017), German mathematician
Sebastian Wille (born 1966), German urologist
Sigrid Wille (born 1969), German cross country skier
Ulrich Wille (1848–1925), Swiss General during the First World War.